Marungapuri block and Marungapuri Taluk is a revenue block and Taluk in the Tiruchirappalli district of Tamil Nadu, India. It has a total of 49 panchayat villages. Marungapuri taluk will have Marungapuri, Valanadu, and Thuvarankurichi firkas as its jurisdictional areas. The Taluk Office is functioning temporarily at T.Kallupatti, about three km away from Marungapuri, on the Tiruchi-Madurai National Highway. Marungapuri taluk will cater to a population of about 1.41 lakh in an area of about 445 square km and the Manapparai taluk to about 2.63 lakh in 544.36 square km. The Taluk Comes Under The Jurisdiction of Srirangam Revenue Divisional Office (RDO).

References 

 

Prominent People

M. Raju BE - Engineer, Educationist, Social activist
Superintending Engineer 
National Highways

Revenue blocks of Tiruchirappalli district